Ivna Franco Marra (born ) is a Brazilian female volleyball player. With her club Sollys Nestlé Osasco she competed at the 2011 FIVB Volleyball Women's Club World Championship and with SESI-SP at the 2014 FIVB Volleyball Women's Club World Championship.

Clubs
  Minas Tênis Clube (2007–2011)
  Sollys Osasco (2011–2013
  SESI-SP (2013–2014)
  Molico Osasco (2014–2016)
  Le Canneto (2016–2017)
  EC Pinheiros (2017–2018)
  Balneário Camboriú (2018–2019)
  Victorina Himeji (2019–)

Awards

Individuals
 2008 U20 South American Championship – "Most Valuable Player"
 2008 U20 South American Championship – "Best Receiver"
 2011 South American Club Championship – "Best Spiker"
 2014 South American Club Championship – "Best Opposite Spiker"

Clubs
 2011–12 Brazilian Superliga –  Champion, with Sollys Osasco
 2012–13 Brazilian Superliga –  Runner-up, with Sollys Osasco
 2013–14 Brazilian Superliga –  Runner-up, with SESI-SP
 2014–15 Brazilian Superliga –  Runner-up, with Molico Osasco
 2016–17 French League –  Runner-up, with Le Cannet
 2011 South American Club Championship –  Champion, with Sollys Osasco
 2014 South American Club Championship –  Champion, with SESI-SP
 2011 FIVB Club World Championship –  Bronze medal, with Sollys Osasco 
 2012 FIVB Club World Championship –  Champion, with Sollys Osasco
 2014 FIVB Club World Championship –  Bronze medal, with SESI-SP

References

External links
 profile at FIVB.org

1990 births
Living people
Brazilian women's volleyball players
Place of birth missing (living people)
Opposite hitters
Expatriate volleyball players in France
Brazilian expatriate sportspeople in France